The 2015–16 Lipscomb Bisons men's basketball team represented Lipscomb University during the 2015–16 NCAA Division I men's basketball season. The Bisons, led by third year head coach Casey Alexander, played their home games at Allen Arena and were members of the Atlantic Sun Conference. They finished the season 12–21, 7–7 in A-Sun play to finish in a tie for fifth place. They defeated Jacksonville in the quarterfinals of the A-Sun tournament to advance to the semifinals where they lost to Stetson.

Roster

Schedule
Sources
 
|-
!colspan=9 style="background:#; color:white;"| Non-conference regular season

|-
!colspan=9 style="background:#; color:white;"| Atlantic Sun Conference regular season

|-
!colspan=9 style="background:#; color:white;"| Atlantic Sun tournament

References

Lipscomb Bisons men's basketball seasons
Lipscomb